NDK may refer to:

 Nucleoside-diphosphate kinase, an enzyme
 National Palace of Culture, a congress centre in Sofia, Bulgaria
 Nihon Dempa Kogyo Co., Ltd., a crystal device manufacturer in Tokyo, Japan
 Nan Desu Kan, an annual anime convention located in Colorado
 The Android NDK (native development kit), the C/C++ SDK for Android apps.